The 1270s is the decade starting January 1, 1270, and ending December 31, 1279.

Significant people

References